The Sacrament World Tour was a concert tour by American metal band Lamb of God. It was in support of the band's 5th studio album Sacrament. It was the biggest tour the band has done to date; and their new DVD, Walk with Me in Hell, which was released on July 1, 2008, contains a documentary and live footage from the World Tour.

History

After touring extensively in 2004 and 2005 for their album Ashes of the Wake, Lamb of God took some time off in late 2005, early 2006 to write material for their new record. In June and July 2006, Lamb of God took some time out of the studio to perform in  Mastodon, Children of Bodom, and Thine Eyes Bleed. After the tour, the band went back into the studio to complete their new album.

In August 2006 Lamb of God released its fifth studio album, Sacrament. The album debuted at number eight on the Billboard 200 and sold nearly 65,000 copies in its first week of sales, nearly doubling the first week sales of Ashes of the Wake. The album received generally positive reviews, with Cosmo Lee of Stylus Magazine stating, "Sacrament has the band's most memorable songs to date. Musically, there's no fat. The band plays with laser precision and songs move smoothly through riffs and transitions." Ed Thompson of IGN referred to Sacrament "one of the best metal albums of 2006", and Jon Pareles of Blender called it a "speed rush all the way through". After the release, Lamb of God took part in the 2006 Gigantour, supporting Megadeth, then continued to tour in Japan, Australia, Europe (as part of The Unholy Alliance European Tour.

In 2007, the band did a headlining tour of the United States and Canada and then returned to Australia and Japan for a "headlining" tour. This tour also took them to Auckland, New Zealand for the first time. The band went on to play major European Festivals in the summer including Rock am Ring and Rock im Park and Download Festival.
Lamb of God returned home in July to co-headline Ozzfest with Ozzy Osbourne. The band went on to play in England and Scotland supporting Heaven and Hell and then back the US for a headlining tour.

Walk with Me In Hell DVD

On July 1, 2008, Lamb of God released their new DVD; Walk with Me in Hell. The DVD is a double-disc and has nearly five hours of footage. It contains the feature documentary Walk with Me in Hell and multiple live performance extras from across the globe on the Sacrament World Tour. As well as the additional full-length feature "Making of Sacrament" plus Lamb of God's entire performance at the 2007 Download Festival, where they performed in front of over 72,000 fans. Extras include deleted scenes, live performance videos for various tour stops, the official music video for "Redneck", and a "Making of ‘Redneck’" documentary.

Typical setlist
Taken from show at Hammerstein Ballroom in New York City on November 30, 2007.
Hourglass
Again We Rise
Walk With Me In Hell
Ruin
Pathetic
As The Palaces Burn
Descending
More Time To Kill
Blacken The Cursed Sun
Bloodletting
11th Hour
Now You’ve Got Something To Die For
What I’ve Become
Laid To Rest
Vigil
Redneck
Black Label

Tour dates

* Lamb of God Headlining Shows
** Headlined the final show of the 2007 Sounds Of The Underground Tour

References

2006 concert tours
2007 concert tours
Lamb of God (band) concert tours